Allenview is a rural locality in the Scenic Rim Region, Queensland, Australia.

Geography 
Most of the eastern boundary is marked by the Logan River where irrigated agriculture is the predominant land use. The North Coast railway line also marks a section of the eastern boundary. In the west is the Wyaralong Dam and Teviot Brook which aligns with a small section of the western boundary.

Allan's Creek (as it is currently spelled) crosses the railway line at the intersection of three present-day localities: Allenview, Bromelton and Gleneagle.

History 
Brooklands State School opened on 3 October 1910 and closed on 1965. It was located at approximately 637 Brookland Road.

Allen's Creek Provisional School opened on 4 October 1927 and closed on 18 September 1929. It was a railway camp school and provided schooling for children of workers building the Sydney–Brisbane rail corridor.

The locality contained 68 households, in which 51.1% of the population were males and 48.9% of the population were females with a median age of 43, 5 above the national average. The average weekly household income was $1,724, $286 above the national average.

Education 
There are no schools in Allenview. The nearest primary schools are Woodhill State School in neighbouring Woodhill to the east and Gleneagle State School in neighbouring Gleneagle to the south-east. The nearest secondary schools are Flagstone State College in Flagstone to the north and Beaudesert State High School in Beaudesert to the south-east.

References

External links

Scenic Rim Region
Localities in Queensland